Tiruchirappalli Monorail is the proposed monorail system for the city of Tiruchirappalli, Tamil Nadu, part of a major expansion of public transport in the city.

As of March 2021 the proposal is still only on paper.

Overview 
As the monorail market is estimated to be  in India, the then Governor of Tamil Nadu, Banwarilal Brohit announced in Legislative assembly that the Government of Tamil Nadu has decided to do a feasibility study for introducing monorail system in Tiruchi along with Salem Metro, Madurai Metro, and Tirunelveli.

Cost 

Network 
A faculty member from SASTRA, using Geographical Information System (GIS) tools, had worked out a proposal for a suburban railway route linking the island town of Srirangam with Tiruchi and its suburbs.

The proposal suggested circular operation in the following routes:
 Srirangam → Amma Mandapam → Tiruchi Fort → Palakkarai → Railway Junction → Golden Rock → Tiruchi Town → Srirangam
 Railway Junction → Palakkarai → Fort → Amma Mandapam → Srirangam → Town → Golden Rock → Railway Junction.

The proposal also suggested a new rail link between Chord line and Tiruchi-Karur railway lines, Via. Amma Mandapam and also a possible extension to Kailasapuram (BHEL) and Bikshandarkovil.

References

External links 

Proposed monorails in India
Rail transport in Tiruchirappalli
Proposed infrastructure in Tamil Nadu